Baba Sulemaye  (born 7 November 1978), known as Baba Sule, is a Ghanaian retired footballer who played as a midfielder.

Club career
Born in Kumasi, Sule arrived in Spain not yet aged 18 from his hometown club Cornerstones FC, and proceeded to represent in the country RCD Mallorca, CD Ourense, CD Leganés, UE Lleida, Tomelloso CF, CD San Isidro, UE Rapitenca and CF Rayo Majadahonda in a stay that would last 11 years, in the Segunda División but also much lower, with very poor individual results: in 1996–97, he only played three times as Mallorca returned to La Liga; over five seasons, also in the second tier, he only made seven league appearances for Madrid-based CD Leganés due to two serious knee injuries.

In 2008, already with a Spanish passport, Sule moved back to Africa, signing with Nigerian team Kwara United FC. He returned to Spain after his retirement due to injuries, working as an electrician, David de Gea's personal driver – before the goalkeeper was eligible for a driving licence – and later a kit man for Segunda División B's CF Fuenlabrada.

References

External links

Alvaro13 profile 

1978 births
Living people
Footballers from Kumasi
Ghanaian footballers
Association football midfielders
Cornerstones F.C. players
Segunda División players
Segunda División B players
Tercera División players
RCD Mallorca players
CD Ourense footballers
CD Leganés players
UE Lleida players
CF Rayo Majadahonda players
Kwara United F.C. players
Ghana under-20 international footballers
Ghanaian expatriate footballers
Expatriate footballers in Spain
Expatriate footballers in Nigeria
Ghanaian expatriate sportspeople in Spain
Ghanaian expatriate sportspeople in Nigeria